Dactylosporangium sucinum is a bacterium from the genus Dactylosporangium which has been isolated from peat swamp forest soil in Thailand.

References

 

Micromonosporaceae
Bacteria described in 2016